Kolbudy is a non-operational PKP railway station in Kolbudy (Pomeranian Voivodeship), Poland. Station was closed on May 29, 1994.

Lines crossing the station

References 
Kolbudy article at Polish stations database, URL accessed at 17 March 2006

Railway stations in Pomeranian Voivodeship
Disused railway stations in Pomeranian Voivodeship
Gdańsk County
Railway stations in Poland opened in 1886